Alexander Robert Kennedy MC is a serving member of the British Army and believed to be the youngest person to be awarded the Military Cross since the Second World War.

Kennedy is originally from Bromsgrove. A private in the Mercian Regiment, he was awarded the MC on 19 March 2010, in recognition of his efforts to aid his injured platoon commander whilst under fire during a battle in Helmand province, Afghanistan in June 2009, when aged only 18.

Private Kennedy was taking part in an operation to clear hostile terrain in Garmsir as point man when his group was ambushed by Taliban insurgents. Three PKM PK machine gun machine gun positions who opened fire from 100 to 150 meters away . All together there were nine Taliban reported. Kennedy's platoon commander was shot three times below the hips lifting him up off the floor. Running back through the machine gun fire to his commander, Kennedy lay on the floor next to him with his back facing the enemy fire to protect him from the elements. Once he had stopped the bleeding, he then started to locate the enemy positions and returned fire with his LMG Light machine gun. While still lay in the prone position. He then donned the platoon commanders radio to direct fire at his attackers. Having done this, the Taliban had then zeroed in on Kennedy. During this his LMG was shot on the handle next to the rear site of his weapon as he was returning fire. Flipping him onto his back, blinding him and deafening him. Once he came to, he then carried on returning weathering fire. 
Bromsgrove District Council recognised Kennedy's actions in a civic reception in 2010, where Major Bob Prophet of the 2nd Battalion Mercian Regiment (Worcesters and Foresters) read his full Military Cross citation. Kennedy requested only a minute's silence for casualties, including Private Robbie Laws of Bromsgrove.

References

External links
Operational Honours and Awards Citations: 19 March 2010, Ministry of Defence, includes Kennedy's citation.

Recipients of the Military Cross
Living people
Mercian Regiment soldiers
British Army personnel of the War in Afghanistan (2001–2021)
People from Bromsgrove
Year of birth missing (living people)
Military personnel from Worcestershire